Manuel dos Santos Fernandes (born 28 March 1974), known as Dos Santos, is a former professional footballer who played as a left back. Born in Cape Verde, Dos Santos represented France internationally.

Football career
Born in Praia, Cape Verde one year before the nation gained independence from Portugal, Dos Santos migrated to France at a very young age, and started his professional career at AS Monaco FC. He then played for Montpellier HSC and Olympique de Marseille, spending four Ligue 1 seasons with the latter: with L'OM, he appeared in nine complete matches in the 2003–04 UEFA Cup, including the 0–2 final loss against Valencia CF which would be his last match for the club.

In the summer of 2004, Portuguese Primeira Liga side S.L. Benfica bought Dos Santos for an undisclosed fee, and he signed a three-year contract. The first-choice during his debut campaign, as the Lisbon-based side ended an 11-year drought in the league, he appeared rarely in the following season, and left in the January 2006 transfer window.

Dos Santos then returned to former club Monaco, where he replaced Manchester United-bound Patrice Evra after signing a -year link. After 46 competitive games during this stint, a new deal was not agreed and he was released.

In July 2007, Dos Santos moved to RC Strasbourg, where he spent one year before announcing his retirement from the game in February 2009, aged 35. Shortly after, however, he signed with amateurs Rapid de Menton, close to where he had fixed his residence in Monaco.

Dos Santos returned to Monaco in 2010, going on to be in charge of its youth teams for several years.

Honours
Monaco
Ligue 1: 1996–97

Montpellier
UEFA Intertoto Cup: 1999

Marseille
UEFA Cup runner-up: 2003–04

Benfica
Primeira Liga: 2004–05
Supertaça Cândido de Oliveira: 2005
Taça de Portugal runner-up: 2004–05

References

External links

1974 births
Living people
Sportspeople from Praia
French footballers
Cape Verdean footballers
Cape Verdean emigrants to France
Association football defenders
Ligue 1 players
AS Monaco FC players
Montpellier HSC players
Olympique de Marseille players
RC Strasbourg Alsace players
Primeira Liga players
S.L. Benfica footballers
Cape Verdean expatriate footballers
Expatriate footballers in France
Expatriate footballers in Portugal
Cape Verdean expatriate sportspeople in Portugal
French sportspeople of Cape Verdean descent
AS Monaco FC non-playing staff